Great God Gold is a 1935 film. It was Arthur Lubin's second film as director.

Plot
In the late 1920s, "Lucky" John Hart has a reputation as a stock market speculator. He does an interview with reported Phil "Stu" Stuart, which predicts the Wall Street Crash. Hart sells his investments just before the Crash.

Later lawyers Simon and Nitto suggest Hart use his reputation to make money in receiverships. Hart agrees in part because he desires Elena, the wife of Nitto's nephew Frank.  Elena and Hart begin an affair.

Harper takes over receivership of the Excelsior Hotel whose president George Harper commits suicide. Harper's daughter Marcia seeks revenge. She falls in love with Stu.

Frank discovers his wife's infidelity and shoots Frank.

Cast
Sidney Blackmer as "Lucky" John Hart
Martha Sleeper as Marcia Harper
Regis Toomey as Phil "Stu" Stuart
Edwin Maxwell as Nitto
Ralf Harolde as Frank Nitto
Maria Alba as Elena Nitto
John T. Murray as Simon
Gloria Shea as Gert

Production
Filming began December 1934.

Reception
The New York Times called it "a half hearted attack on the receivership racket... it's feeble as a crusade and sluggish as melodrama."

Writing for The Spectator, Graham Greene described the film as "an excellent American melodrama", commenting that despite the lack of big-name stars the acting displayed a "delightful vividness" and "even the hats have been carefully chosen: the crookeder the deal, the more flowing the brim".

References

External links
 Great God Gold at IMDb
Great God Gold at TCMDB
Great God Gold at Letterbox DVD
Great God Gold at BFI
Review of film at Variety
Complete film at Classic Movies

1934 films
1934 crime drama films
Films directed by Arthur Lubin
American crime drama films
American black-and-white films
1930s English-language films
1930s American films